Esther Croes (born 28 July 1966) is a former synchronized swimmer from the Netherlands Antilles. She competed in both the women's duet competitions at the 1984 Summer Olympics.

References 

1966 births
Living people
Dutch Antillean synchronized swimmers
Olympic synchronized swimmers of the Netherlands Antilles
Synchronized swimmers at the 1984 Summer Olympics
Dutch sportswomen